María del Mar Gómez Saura (born 16 October 1975), commonly known as Mar Saura, is a Spanish actress, model and TV presenter.

Biography 
Mar Saura was born in Barcelona, Spain.
She won Miss Barcelona in 1992, and competed for Miss Spain.

She began her professional career as a model with Gaudi, Cibeles, and Francina International Modeling Agency, and resided in New York, Milan and Japan.

After her time as a model, she started work as a TV presenter and actress.
During this time, she appeared in the series One Two (1998–1999) and acted alongside Lina Morgan on Spanish Television, in addition to having cameos in episodes of other Spanish television series. In her movie career, she created a children's film, King Farm (2002).

Subsequently, she has presented several variety shows such as The Night of Errors (2002) with Josema Yuste; Summer Night (2002) with Bertin Osborne; The Show of Records (2001), with Manu Carreño and collaborated on Full Light (2002) with Pedro Piqueras. She was a contestant on Double (2003) and Call and Win (2003), both on Antena 3, and on Overnight Sensational (2007) on Canal Nou. She appeared in numerous galas on TVE, including the New Year's Eve Specials for 2003, 2004 and 2005, all directed by José Luis Moreno.

Through José Luis Moreno her career as an actress has had a revival since late 2008, when she played Ainhoa, the girlfriend of the lawyer Michael, in Scenes from Marriage on Telecinco.

In Mexico, she participated in the 2010 series  Capadocia as Julieta Pusch and  Killer Women, being considered part of the Latina movement with Cuban William Levy, posing for Glamour magazine in an Icon Vallarta dress by Dolce & Gabbana.

In 2011, again on Telecinco, she appeared in the series Ángel o demonio as Alexia. She writes a blog at Mujerhoy.com. In April 2013, she began recording AI with Ruben Poveda on Four.

Filmography

TV Series

Awards 
 Point Radio La Rioja Award for Best Actress in 2011 for fiction series Ángel o demonio.

References

External links 
 Home Page
 
 

1975 births
Living people
Actresses from Barcelona
Spanish female models
Spanish film actresses
Spanish television actresses
Spanish beauty pageant winners
Spanish expatriates in Mexico
21st-century Spanish actresses